Saba holds elections for the island council and the electoral colleges for the Senate.

Latest elections

Past Elections

See also
 Electoral calendar
 Electoral system

References

External links

 
Saba